HMS Fox was a 28-gun  sixth-rate frigate of the Royal Navy.  Fox was first commissioned in October 1775 under the command of Captain Patrick Fotheringham. The Americans captured her in June 1777, only to have the British recapture her about a month later. The French then captured her a little less than a year after that, only to lose her to grounding in 1779, some six months later.

Career

Capture

On 7 June 1777 Fox was cruising off the Grand Banks of Newfoundland when she sighted a strange vessel. Fox sailed towards the stranger until she sighted yet another strange vessel. Suspecting that these were both American frigates, Fox attempted to escape. However, the first of the two, caught up with Fox and an engagement started that lasted for about a half-hour before  was able to join the combat. Fox again attempted to sail away, but Hancock caught up and opened fire. After Boston came up too and was able to shoot away Foxs mainmast and wheel, Fotheringham struck. Fox had lost four men killed and eight wounded.

Recapture

Rainbow had left Halifax in the morning of 6 July and in the afternoon sighted three sail. She gave chase, during which HMS Flora came up independently and proceeded to engage one of the unknown vessels. The next day Rainbow and Flora exchanged quarry, with Rainbow pursuing the largest enemy vessel, accepting that one of the three American vessels would necessarily escape. The brig Victor was a poor sailer and essentially played no role in the engagement. Ultimately, Rainbow captured Hancock after a 39-hour chase, but Boston escaped to the Sheepscot River on the Maine coast. (Captain McNeill, of Boston, was court-martialed in June 1779 for his failure to support Hancock and was dismissed from the U.S. Navy.)

Collier's after-action letter made no mention of any casualties on either side, even though the vessels had exchanged some fire. Hancock normally had a complement of 290 men, but only 229 on board when Rainbow captured her; the remainder were a prize crew on Fox. Fotheringham and 40 of his men were prisoners on Hancock. The other officers and some of the men were aboard Boston, and Captain John Manley of Hancock had put most into a fishing vessel and sent them to Newfoundland. Because of the number of American prisoners involved, Rainbow took Hancock into Halifax. When Collier arrived at Halifax he was delighted to see that Flora had captured Fox and that they had arrived there before him.

Fotheringham then sailed Fox back to England. There he was tried for the loss of his ship, and acquitted.

And capture again

The French frigate  captured Fox on 11 September 1778. Fox, now under the command of Captain the Honourable Thomas Windsor, was off Brest when she sighted a ship and sloop. Fox gave chase, but the weather made visibility poor and obscured Junons approach. When Fox finally sighted Junon, Fox prepared to engage. The two vessels maneuvered against each other until finally they gave up and simply exchanged broadsides. Junon, unusually for a French vessel, fired at Foxs hull rather than her rigging, with the result that Junons heavier guns were able to inflict heavy casualties on Fox, and shoot away her three masts. Windsor was forced to strike, having lost 14 men killed and 32 wounded.

Fate
Fox ran aground in March 1779 on Pointe St Jacques on the Rhuys Peninsula and could not be refloated.

Citations and references
Citations

References

External links
 

 

1773 ships
Sixth-rate frigates of the Royal Navy
Ships built in Southampton
Captured ships
Maritime incidents in 1779